The Happy Pet is a handheld digital pet released in Japan in 2003 by Bandai.

Gameplay
The Happy Pet is similar to Bandai's previous release, the Tamagotchi. Like the Tamagotchi, the Happy Pet is a pixelised creature housed in a computer worn around the wrist. Unlike Tamagotchi, which involves raising imaginary creatures, the Happy Pet involves raising a real-life animal. It operates on a touch screen. The touch screen enables the user to stroke the pet to either praise, discipline or cure the pet. The pet has intelligence and friendliness levels, depending on how well the user looks after it. However, the Happy Pet does not evolve. The three buttons can be used to feed the pet or play games with it. The buttons can also be used to see what the pet is currently thinking or feeling.

Variations
The first release of the Happy Pet was a chihuahua. Later editions included cats and dolphins.

External links
 Company's official website
 Happy Pet at Pixelmood

Handheld virtual pets
Products introduced in 2003
2000s toys
Bandai